Tongue bifurcation may refer to:

Tongue splitting, a type of body modification
Forked tongue, a physical characteristic of certain animals

See also